Dorothy Elsie Wilkinson (October 9, 1921 - March 18, 2023) was an American former softball player and bowler, who is a member of the halls of fame in both sports.

Career
Wilkinson played softball from 1933 to 1965, helping her team, the Phoenix Ramblers, to the national title in 1940, 1948, and 1949. She was an All-American nineteen seasons as an amateur softball player. Among her feats, she batted an average of .455 in 1954, .450 in 1955, and .387 on the Ramblers championship runner up year of 1957.

As a professional bowler, she won the Women's International Bowling Queen's Tournament (a bowling triple crown event) in 1962, and the WIBC singles in 1963.

She was inducted into the National Softball Hall of Fame and Museum in 1970, her first year of eligibility. She was inducted into the International Bowling Hall of Fame twenty years later, in 1990.

Wilkinson occasionally attends high school, college and tournament softball games in Arizona, where she and some of her former teammates are honored frequently. The Arizona Republic newspaper chose her at number eight among Arizona's all-time greatest athletes in 1999. As of April 2020, Wilkinson was the oldest living member of the Arizona Sports Hall of Fame at the age of 98. She turned 100 in October 2021.

Honours

References

Further reading 
 Ames, Lynn “Out at the Plate: The Dot Wilkinson Story” (Chicago Review Press, 2023)
 Purcell, Laura A. The Queens and the Ramblers: Women's Championship Softball in Phoenix, 1932–1965 (Arizona State University: Dissertation)

1921 births
Living people
American centenarians
Women centenarians
American ten-pin bowling players
American sportswomen
Place of birth missing (living people)
Sportspeople from Phoenix, Arizona
Softball players from Arizona
21st-century American women